Kálmán Bartalis (May 16, 1889 – February 1982) was a Hungarian polo player who competed in the 1936 Summer Olympics. Born in Szamosújvár, he was part of the Hungarian polo team, which finished fourth. He played one match in the 1936 tournament.

References
Kálmán Bartalis's profile at Sports Reference.com

1889 births
1982 deaths
Hungarian polo players
Olympic polo players of Hungary
Polo players at the 1936 Summer Olympics